Mitobronitol (1,6-dibromo-1,6-dideoxy-D-mannitol) is a brominated analog of mannitol. It is an anticancer drug that is classified as an alkylating agent.

References

Alkylating antineoplastic agents
Organobromides
DNA replication inhibitors
Monosaccharide derivatives
Halohydrins